The Bavarian Concordat was a concordat of 29 March 1924 between the Free State of Bavaria and the Holy See, replacing the concordat with the Kingdom of Bavaria, which had fallen in 1918. Negotiations were led by the Apostolic Nuncio to Bavaria, Eugenio Pacelli, the future pope Pius XII.

Sources

1920s in Bavaria
Treaties of the Holy See (1870–1929)